Synchiropus laddi, the Ladd's dragonet, is a species of fish in the family Callionymidae, the dragonets. It is found in the Pacific Ocean.

Etymology
The fish is named in honor of geologist Harry Stephen Ladd (1899-1982), of the U.S. Geological Survey, who was at Bikini Atoll, Marshall Islands (type locality), during Operations Crossroads (1946 and again in 1947), studying the effects of the atomic bombs,

References

laddi
Fish of the Pacific Ocean
Taxa named by Leonard Peter Schultz
Fish described in 1960